= Knorr Beeswax Candles =

Candle maker

Knorr Beeswax Candles is a beeswax candle maker dating to the 1900s and Ferdinand Knorr who opened the business in 1928. His son Henry took over in 1957 and grandson Steven took over in 1982. The candles are sold in 33 colors and have various patterns, shapes, sizes, and designs.

Their only physical store was closed down in 2023. Their sales activities take place through their website.
